a.k.a. Cartoon is a Canadian animation studio located in Vancouver, British Columbia. It was founded on April 1, 1994, by Danny Antonucci. The company's motto is "Dedicated to producing animation for everyone, whether they want it or not!"

a.k.a. Cartoon created and produced The Brothers Grunt and Cartoon Sushi — both for MTV, as well as Cartoon Network's Ed, Edd n Eddy. Since 2015, the studio has been working on several projects, including an animated pilot titled Snotrocket.

The studio's original logo is a man, actually based on Danny himself being impaled by a giant pencil.

Filmography

Television series

Television pilots

Television films and specials

References

External links
Animation by Mistake official website. Archived from the original on June 4, 2004.
A.k.a Cartoons on Internet Movie Database

 
Danny Antonucci
Canadian animation studios
Mass media companies established in 1994
Companies based in Vancouver
1994 establishments in British Columbia